Holmes–Hendrickson House is located in Holmdel Township, Monmouth County, New Jersey, United States. The house was built in 1754 and was added to the National Register of Historic Places on April 26, 1978.

The house is one of several houses owned and operated as a historic house museum by the Monmouth County Historical Association.  It is open seasonally.

See also
National Register of Historic Places listings in Monmouth County, New Jersey
List of the oldest buildings in New Jersey
List of museums in New Jersey
Longstreet Farm
Holmdel Park

References

External links
 Monmouth County Historical Association

Houses completed in 1754
Historic house museums in New Jersey
Holmdel Township, New Jersey
Houses in Monmouth County, New Jersey
Houses on the National Register of Historic Places in New Jersey
Museums in Monmouth County, New Jersey
National Register of Historic Places in Monmouth County, New Jersey
1754 establishments in New Jersey
New Jersey Register of Historic Places